Grand Rapids Airport  is located  southwest of Grand Rapids, Manitoba, Canada.

References

Registered aerodromes in Manitoba